Anton Pelinka (born October 14, 1941) is a professor of political science and nationalism studies at the English-speaking Central European University of Budapest. Prior to this appointment, Pelinka was a professor of political science at the University of Innsbruck, one of Austria's largest universities. During his career he has also served as a dean, with his most recent tenure in this role occurring between the years of 2004 and 2006 when he was dean of the Faculty of Political Science and Sociology at the University of Innsbruck.

Anton Pelinka was born in the Austrian capital city of Vienna.

Life
After completing studies in jurisprudence at the University of Vienna (Ph.D 1964) as well as Political Science at the Institute for Advanced Studies, he worked for the weekly Newspaper "Die Furche". His first academic job was as an assistant. He returned to the Institute for Advanced Studies, whose principal at the time was the Austrian-American historian Ernst Florian Winter. In 1971, he went to Salzburg where he qualified as a university lecturer a year later. Afterwards he went to Germany to teach in Essen and Berlin for two years. In 1975, he got a permanent professorial chair at the University of Innsbruck. He has been a visiting professor at many universities abroad. In 1977 he was at the Jawaharlal Nehru University in New-Delhi. In the United States he went to the University of New Orleans in 1981, to the Stanford University in 1997 and to the University of Michigan in Ann Arbor from 2001 to 2002. During this time he also visited the Université Libre de Bruxelles. He was also at Harvard University (1990 to 1991) and the Collegium Budapest (1994) for the purpose of research.

In October 2004, Anton Pelinka was appointed as a full professor at the University of Innsbruck. On January 1, 2005 he was selected as dean of the new Faculty of Political Science and Sociology. He held this position until his move to the Central European University of Budapest.

Pelinka is also head of the Society for Political Education and a regular commentator for major newspapers and media channels in Austria and several other countries.

In addition to his activities as a scientist he was Austria's representative in a commission against racism and xenophobia in the European Union during the 1990s.

After Pelinka reproached Jörg Haider for playing down National Socialism in the Italian television in 1999, Haider sued him for defamation. In 2001, Anton Pelinka was found not liable.

Scientific Research and Doctrine

WorldCat (Worldcat Identities) lists none the less than nine of his works which achieved a global library presence of more than 300 global libraries. Pelinka published on a very wide range of topics in contemporary political science. OCLC Classify 
suggests that his most widely circulated works deal with Prejudice (Handbook of prejudice), Global Austria (Global Austria : Austria's place in Europe and the world), Austria : out of the shadow of the past, peace research (Friedensforschung, Konfliktforschung, Demokratieforschung  ein Handbuch), Social democracy (Social democratic parties in Europe), the Haider phenomenon in Austria, the challenge of ethnic conflict, democracy, and self-determination in Central Europe, Austrian historical memory & national identity, and Democracy in India (Democracy Indian style : Subhas Chandra Bose and the creation of India's political culture). Pelinka's main emphases are on democratic theories, political systems and political culture in Austria and the comparative research on parties and associations. He is a leading international expert on topics like right-wing extremism and xenophobia in society. Between 1965 and 2019, Pelinka published 92 scholarly articles in major peer reviewed journals of political science, documented at the Columbia University New York Library.

Work

Pelinka has several publications dealing with topics of interest, especially the Austrian political system. In "Fünf Fragen an drei Generationen. Der Antisemitismus und wir heute" (Five questions to three generations. Anti-semitism and us today), he discusses the historical changes in Austrian society. He is co-editor, with Ruth Wodak, of Austrian journal, "The Haider Phenomenon". It deals with the rise of the Austrian Freedom Party (FPÖ) under the chairmanship of Jörg Haider and further the impact of parties and economical or social factors on society.

Bibliography (selection)
Democratical Theories
   
 Dynamische Demokratie. Zur konkreten Utopie gesellschaftlicher Gleichheit. (Dynamic Democracy. The Concrete Utopia of Social Equality) Stuttgart 1974.
 Politics of the Lesser Evil: Leadership, Democracy, and Jaruelski's Poland, Frankfurt am Main 1996.
 Demokratie in Indien. Subhas Chandra Bose und das Werden der politischen Kultur. (Democracy in India: Subhas Chandra Bose and the creation of India's political culture). Innsbruck 2005.

Political System and Political Culture in Austria

 The Haider Phenomenon. New Brunswick (NJ) 2001
 Austria in the European Union (Contemporary Austrian Studies)
 Global Austria: Austria's Place in Europe and the World (Contemporary Austrian Studies)

Awards

 1998: Willy und Helga Verkauf-Verlon Preis des DÖW (Willy and Helga Verkauf-Verlon Award from the Documentation Center of Austrian Resistance)
     2005: Preis der Stadt Wien für Geisteswissenschaften (Award for Humanities from the City of Vienna)

References

External links

 
 Artikel: Demokratie jenseits des Staates. Über die (Un-)Möglichkeit einer transnationalen Demokratie
 Zum Rechtsstreit mit Jörg Haider
 Anton Pelinka beim Department of Political Science der Budapester Central European University (engl.)
 OCLC Classify
 CLIO Catalogue Columbia University New York, books
 CLIO Catalogue Columbia University New York, articles
 Worldcat Identities, Pelinka entry

1941 births
Living people
Austrian political scientists
Academic staff of Central European University
University of Vienna alumni
Academic staff of the University of Innsbruck
University of Michigan faculty